The 2000–01 ISU Junior Grand Prix was the fourth season of the ISU Junior Grand Prix, a series of international junior level competitions organized by the International Skating Union. It was the junior-level complement to the Grand Prix of Figure Skating, which was for senior-level skaters. Skaters competed in the disciplines of men's singles, ladies' singles, pair skating, and ice dance. The top skaters from the series met at the Junior Grand Prix Final.

Competitions
The locations of the JGP events change yearly. In the 2000–01 season, the series was composed of the following events:

Junior Grand Prix Final qualifiers
The following skaters qualified for the 2000–01 Junior Grand Prix Final, in order of qualification.

Medalists

Men

Ladies

Pairs

Ice dance

Medals table

References

External links
 2000–01 Results
 2000–01 Junior Grand Prix Final result
 2000 Pokal der Blauen Schwerter (Germany) result details

ISU Junior Grand Prix
2000 in figure skating